Keith Marshall (22 April 1907 – 23 September 1993) was an  Australian rules footballer who played with Fitzroy in the Victorian Football League (VFL).

Notes

External links 

1907 births
1993 deaths
Australian rules footballers from Victoria (Australia)
Fitzroy Football Club players